Bocas del Toro Patois, or Panamanian Patois English, is a dialect of Jamaican Patois, an English-based creole, spoken in Bocas del Toro Province, Panama. It is similar to Central American varieties such as Limonese Creole. It does not have the status of an official language. It was pejoratively known as "guari-guari."

See also
Jamaican Patois
Bajan Creole
English-based creoles

References

Afro-Jamaican culture
Afro-Panamanian
English language in North America
Creoles of the Americas
English-based pidgins and creoles
Languages of Panama
Bocas del Toro Province
Languages of the African diaspora